Carlos Armando Reyes López (born 24 February 1957) is a Mexican politician affiliated with the National Action Party. As of 2014 he served as Deputy of the LX Legislature of the Mexican Congress representing Chihuahua.

References

1957 births
Living people
Politicians from Chihuahua (state)
National Action Party (Mexico) politicians
21st-century Mexican politicians
People from Ciudad Jiménez
Deputies of the LX Legislature of Mexico
Members of the Chamber of Deputies (Mexico) for Chihuahua (state)